The 2016 Missouri Valley Conference baseball tournament will be held from May 25 through 28.  All eight baseball-sponsoring schools in the conference will participate in the double-elimination tournament to be held at Indiana State's Bob Warn Field at Sycamore Stadium in Terre Haute, Indiana.  The winner of the tournament will earn the conference's automatic bid to the 2016 NCAA Division I baseball tournament.

Seeding and format
The league's eight teams will be seeded based on conference winning percentage.  The teams will play a two bracket, double-elimination format tournament, with the winner of each bracket then playing a single elimination final.

Results

References

Tournament
Missouri Valley Conference Baseball Tournament
Missouri Valley Conference baseball tournament
Missouri Valley Conference baseball tournament